The National Technological University – Haedo Regional Faculty (Castilian:Universidad Tecnológica Nacional - Facultad Regional Haedo (UTN-FRH)) is an affiliate of the National Technological University, the leading institution of its type in Argentina. 
Located in Haedo, a western suburb of Buenos Aires, it was established in 1967 and offers academic degrees in the following subjects:

 Aeronautical engineering
 Electronic engineering
 Industrial engineering
 Mechanical engineering
 Railway engineering

See also
UTN

Haedo
Educational institutions established in 1967
Engineering universities and colleges in Argentina
Technical universities and colleges in Argentina